The Parliament of Bermuda is the bicameral legislature in the British Overseas Territory of Bermuda. The two houses are:

 The House of Assembly which has 36 members, elected for a five-year term in single seat constituencies.
 The Senate which has 11 appointed members.

Originally, the House of Assembly was the only house in the legislature. It held its first session in 1620, making Bermuda's Parliament amongst the world's oldest legislatures and the oldest extant legislature in the Americas. An appointed Privy Council originally performed roles similar to those of an upper house and of a cabinet.

A major constitutional change took place in 1968. The Legislative Council was replaced with an appointed Senate. Political parties were legalised, and universal adult suffrage adopted. The position of Premier was also introduced as leader of the ruling party, and an official opposition.

Latest results - House of Assembly

References

External links
 
 Bermuda Government website

Bermuda
Politics of Bermuda
Political organisations based in Bermuda
Bermuda